The Commander-in-Chief of the Ground Forces is the professional head of the Kazakh Ground Forces. He/she is responsible for the administration and the operational control of the Ground Forces. The current Commander is Major General Talgat Koibakov.

The position of the Commander of the Ground Forces, as well as the state institution that is the Directorate of the Commander of the Ground Forces did not exist from July 2000 to June 2002 and from November 2004 to April 2009. In the indicated periods, the Ground Forces of Kazakhstan did not have their own centralized command and control body. On 14 June 2002, the office was created. The ground forces, in addition to regional commands, were subordinate to the Committee of the Chiefs of Staff of the armed forces.

List of Commanders

|-style="text-align:center;"
! colspan=9|

References

Military of Kazakhstan
Kazakhstan